Ahmad Nematollahi (born 11 November 1993 in Qom, Iran) is an Iranian footballer who plays as a centre-back.

Honours
Esteghlal
Iranian Football League: 2012–13

Facebook

Instagram

Club career statistics

References

External links
 Ahmad Nematollahi at Soccerpunter
 Ahmad Nematollahi at Whoscored
 

Living people
1993 births
Iranian footballers
Esteghlal F.C. players
Saba players
Association football defenders
People from Qom